John or Johnny Hayes may refer to:

Arts and entertainment 
J. Milton Hayes (1884–1940), English actor and poet
John F. Hayes (author) (1904–1980), Canadian writer
John Michael Hayes (1919–2008), American screenwriter
John Hayes (director) (1930–2000), American director of low-budget films
John Hayes (radio), American radio executive

Politics

U.K.
John Hayes (1643–1705), MP for Winchelsea
Jack Hayes (politician) (John Henry Hayes, 1887–1941), Member of Parliament for Liverpool Edge Hill
John Hayes (British politician) (born 1958), British politician and MP
Seán Hayes (Cork politician) (otherwise known as John Hayes, 1884–1928), Sinn Féin member of the 1st Dáil Éireann, and the 2nd and 3rd

U.S.
John F. Hayes (Borough President of Brooklyn) (1915–2001), American politician
John F. Hayes (Kansas legislator) (1919–2010), Kansas attorney and former Majority Leader of the Kansas House of Representatives
Johnny H. Hayes (1941–2008), Tennessee Democratic politician and fundraiser

Other politicians
John Hayes (Tasmanian politician) (1868–1956), Australian politician, Premier of Tasmania, 1922–1923
John Hayes (Queensland politician) (1897–1986), member of the Queensland Legislative Assembly
John Hayes (New Zealand politician) (born 1948), New Zealand diplomat and politician

Military
Sir John Hayes, 1st Baronet (c. 1750–1809), military physician
John Hayes (explorer) (1768–1831), of the British East India Company
John Hayes (Royal Navy officer) (1767/1775–1838), Royal Navy admiral
John Hayes (sailor) (1832–1911), American Civil War sailor and Medal of Honor recipient
John Daniel Hayes (1902–1991), U.S. Navy admiral and naval historian
John Osler Chattock Hayes (1913–1998), British admiral
John B. Hayes (1924–2001), U.S. Coast Guard commandant
John Alfred Hayes, Union Army surgeon and officer

Sports

Australian rules football
John Hayes (footballer, born 1903) (1903–1977), Australian rules footballer for Fitzroy
John Hayes (footballer, born 1936), Australian rules footballer for St Kilda
John Hayes (footballer, born 1939), Australian rules footballer, former Fitzroy VFL captain

Other sports
John Hayes (baseball) (1855–1904), baseball player
Johnny Hayes (1886–1965), American marathon runner
Johnny Hayes (baseball) (1910–1988), American Negro league baseball player
John Hayes (harness racer) (1919–1998), harness racing driver/trainer/owner
John Hayes (cricketer) (1927–2007), New Zealand Test cricketer
John Hayes (rugby league) (born 1939), Australian rugby league footballer
John Bouchier-Hayes (born 1944), Irish Olympic fencer
John Hayes (tennis) (born 1955), American tennis player, who was on the tour in the early 1980s
John Hayes (soccer) (born 1960), U.S. soccer player
J. P. Hayes (born 1965), American golfer
John Hayes (rugby union) (born 1973), Irish prop forward
John Hayes (Gaelic footballer), Irish Gaelic football player
John Joe Hayes, Irish hurler

Others
John Hayes (1685–1726), killed by his wife Catherine Hayes (murderer); tried for the murder and executed by burning at the stake.
John Hayes (painter) (1786?–1866), British portrait artist
John E. Hayes, American chemosensory psychophysicist
John Hayes (unionist) (1854–1942), American labor union leader
John M. Hayes (priest) (1887–1957), Irish Catholic priest
John 'Chow' Hayes (1911–1993), Australian criminal
John Hayes (art historian) (1929–2005), British art historian and museum director, expert on Gainsborough
John M. Hayes (scientist) (1940–2017), scientist emeritus at Woods Hole Oceanographic Institution
John Hayes, co-founder of software publisher Peachtree Accounting
John P. Hayes, Irish-American computer scientist and electrical engineer
John S. Hayes, newspaper executive and American ambassador
John W. Hayes, British archaeologist

See also
Jackie Hayes (disambiguation)
John Hays (disambiguation)
John Hay (disambiguation)
Jonny Hayes (born 1987), Irish footballer
Jonathan Hayes (born 1962), former professional American football tight end